Balfourodendron is a genus of plant in family Rutaceae. It contains the following species:

 Balfourodendron eburneum
 Balfourodendron molle
 Balfourodendron riedelianum, Engl.

References 

 
Zanthoxyloideae genera
Taxonomy articles created by Polbot